Chanal may refer to:

Chanal M.O (2012-present) singer/band.
 Chanal, Chiapas, a town in Mexico
 El Chanal, an archaeological site in Colima, Mexico
 Hatutu, an island in French Polynesia
 5671 Chanal, a minor planet

People with the surname
 Eugène Chanal (1868–1951), French politician
 Pierre Chanal (1946–2003), French soldier and suspected serial killer

See also 
 Channal, a village in India
 Chanel (disambiguation)

 Canal (disambiguation)

French-language surnames